The Vijay for Best Make Up is given by STAR Vijay as part of its annual Vijay Awards ceremony for Tamil  (Kollywood) films.

The list
Here is a list of the award winners and the films for which they won.

Nominations 
2008 Yogesh, Banu - Vaaranam Aayiram 
Michael Westmore - Dasavathaaram
Shanmugam, Manohar - Poo
Vanitha Krishnamoorthy, Harinath - Bommalattam
2009 Sasi, Das - Naan Kadavul 
Pattanam Raseed - Kanchivaram
Nellai Shanmugam - Kanthaswamy
S. A. Shanmugam - Naadodigal
Sasi - Pokkisham
 2010 Banu - Endhiran
 2011 Gothandapani - 7aum Arivu
Dasarathan - Avan Ivan
Vinoth Sukumaran - Aaranya Kaandam
K. P. Sasikumar - Vaagai Sooda Vaa
Vinod - Engeyum Eppodhum
 2012 Sarath Kumar - Aravaan
 2013 Dasarathan - Paradesi
 Albert Chettiyar, Avinash, Bujji Babu, Ramachandran, Ramu & Shanmugam - Raja Rani
 Gage Hubard & Ralis Khan - Vishwaroopam
 Irma Dataushvali, Mohideen Kumar, Nicky Rajani, Ramachandran & Ratan Gupta - Irandam Ulagam
 Ramesh Mohanty, Thomas Van Der Nest - Maryan
 2014 Pattanam Rasheed, Pattanam Sha, Siva, Promod - Kaaviya Thalaivan
Gothandapani & Banu - Lingaa
Lalitha Rajamanikam, Mari Nagendra & Gopi - Yaamirukka Bayamey
Vinoth Sukumaran - Mundasupatti
Vinoth Sukumaran - Jigarthanda

See also
 Tamil cinema
 Cinema of India

References

Make Up
Film awards for makeup and hairstyling